Full Circle Nightmare is the second studio by American musician Kyle Craft. It was released in February 2018 under Sub Pop Records.

Track listing

References

2018 albums
Sub Pop albums
Kyle Craft albums